Paulina Remixes is the first remix album by Mexican recording artist Paulina Rubio. It was released on January 16, 2007 through EMI Music. The album contains remixes of tracks from her first four studio albums—La Chica Dorada (1992), 24 Kilates (1993), El Tiempo Es Oro (1995) and Planeta Paulina (1996)—and a new remix of  her "Megahits". The remixes were done by NPS, Alejandro "Midi" Ortega, and Mijangos. The music was influenced by various genres of club music, such as dance and house.

Paulina Remixes received positive reviews from music critics. Some reviewers called it a good remix compilation.

Release
Paulina Remixes received little promotion compared to Rubio's standards. On November 30, 2006, her first remix album was released through digital stores like Amazon and ITunes Store. Fans were excited because it was a novelty and Paulina Rubio's website put it up for sale. On January 16, 2007 Paulina Remixes was launched in digital format in Mexico and the United States.

Critical reception
Paulina Remixes received positive reviews from music critics. Joey Guerra from Amazon wrote that "It's been more than a decade since Paulina Rubio left her golden-girl image at EMI Latin for a more liberating run at Universal Music. But her former label continues to mine Rubio's catalog for hits packages, rehashes and rarities. Most of the recent releases have been forgettable repeats, but Paulina Remixes assembles an impressive collection of often-impossible-to-find versions of Rubio's early hits. "Te Daría Mi Vida," "Nada de Ti" and "Siempre Tuya desde la Raíz" still sparkle in their dance-floor dress; and the Mijangos remixes of "Enamorada" (featured here in the English-language "I'm So in Love" version) remains a deliciously dramatic glitterball high. Paulina Remixes even includes amped-up mixes of "Él Me Engañó," "Sabor A Miel" and "Asunto De Dos" - unlikely choices that benefitted from a DJ's touch. Musically, Rubio may be long past these sparkly gems, but they remain essential for fans and club-bunnies alike."

Track listing

Notes
 signifies that it is the name that was assigned to "Solo Por Ti"  remix
 signifies that it is the name that was assigned to "I'm So In Love"  remix
 signifies that it is the name that was assigned to "Siempre Tuya Desde La Raíz"  remix

Personnel
Based on Discogs
Andrei Cruz – A&R
Jeannette Ruiz – art direction

References

Paulina Rubio remix albums
2007 remix albums
2007 compilation albums
EMI Records compilation albums
EMI Records remix albums
Spanish-language remix albums